This is a list of Archaeological Protected Monuments in Jaffna District, Sri Lanka.

Notes

References

External links 
 
 

 
Archaeological